This is a timeline of the history of Sky One and its spin-off channels.

1980s
 1980
 Plans for a pan-European satellite television station are put together by Brian Haynes, back by backed by Guinness Mahon and Barclays Merchant Bank and in November Mr Haynes sets up Satellite Television Ltd. (SATV)

1981
 21 October – SATV begins test transmissions on the Orbital Test Satellite after the European Space Agency allowed the company to test the satellite for the use of commercial television, with an hour of light entertainment in English each night. The low-powered satellite forces it to broadcast to cable systems rather than directly to individual satellite dishes.

 1982
 26 April – Satellite Television launches as a pan-European service. The channel is often referred to on-screen as Super Station Europe. However the channel is initially only available in some European countries, with Norway and Finland being the first two countries to permit the new service's transmission via cable, followed by Malta, Switzerland and West Germany.

 1983 
 27 June – News International becomes the majority shareholder of Satellite Television. broadcast hours are extended and the channel starts to be seen in more countries.
 16 October – Satellite Television begins broadcasting in the UK.

 1984
 16 January – Satellite Television is renamed Sky Channel. It also sees the first programmes commissioned for the channel although they mainly consist of children’s and music programming.

 1985
 20 July – Sky Channel launches a weekend morning children’s programming block called Fun Factory.

 1986
 1 September – The DJ Kat Show launches as a weekday children's programming block. It airs at breakfast and in the late afternoons.

 1987
 No events.

 1988
 8 June – Rupert Murdoch announces plans to launch a four-channel service on the soon to be launched Astra satellite. One of the four channels will be Sky Channel.

 1989
 5 February – Sky Television launches at 6.00pm. The channel line-up consists of Sky Channel, Sky News, Sky Movies and Eurosport.
 31 July – Sky Channel becomes a UK and Ireland-only service and is renamed Sky One although for a short time after the relaunch, some of Sky Channel's former pan-European programming is broadcast in the hours before Eurosport's startup, and the programme block is branded as Sky Europe.
 Sky steps up its original content when it begins commissioning programming beyond music and children's shows. Content includes a morning show Sky By Day, current affairs series Frank Bough's World and Jameson Tonight and new game shows, including revivals of Blockbusters, The Price Is Right and Sale of the Century.

1990s

 1990
 January–March – Sky One shows live coverage of England's cricketing tour to the West Indies. This is the first time that full live coverage of an overseas tour has been shown in the UK. 
 2 September – Sky One begins airing the American animated series The Simpsons as part of a strategy of showing more recent programming.
 2 November – Sky TV and BSB merge. The new company is called BSkyB.
 2 December – Sky One launches on the Marcopolo satellite. It replaces BSB's entertainment channel Galaxy.

 1991
 No events.

 1992
 31 December – Sky One stops broadcasting via the Marcopolo satellite.

 1993
 1 September – Sky Multichannels launches and consequently Sky One becomes a pay television channel.

 1994
 11 September – After nine years on air, the final edition of children’s programming block Fun Factory is broadcast.
 Sky One returns to commissioning music programmes when it starts their own music show The Coca Cola Hit Mix (also known as The Hit Mix). featuring music news and guests at the time. The show features regular competitions, phone ins with guests and other features. This later evolves into a late night broadcast called Hit Mix Long Play which is shown through the night until the early 2000s.

 1995
 31 December – The children programming block The DJ Kat Show is axed after almost a decade on air due to low viewing figures.

 1996
 1 September – Sky 2 launches as an evening and overnight service and Sky One rebrands as Sky 1.
 October – Children's programming on Sky One is reduced following the launch of Fox Kids Network and most of the programmes shown on Sky One move to the new channel.

 1997
 31 August – Sky 2 stops broadcasting and Sky 1 reverts to being called Sky One.
 14 October – The first episode of footballing drama series Dream Team is broadcast. It goes on to air for the next ten years.

 1998
 1 October – Sky Digital launches.
 15 November – Rival digital television service ONdigital launches. Sky had originally been a partner in the venture but was forced to pull out by the Independent Television Commission. However, some Sky channels, including Sky One, launches on the service.

 1999
 No events.

2000s
 2000
 A dedicated feed of Sky One for Ireland is launched although for most of its existence, the only difference between it and the United Kingdom feed has been differing commercials and programme promotions.

 2001
 27 September – Sky stops broadcasting via analogue. Sky had originally planned to switch off its analogue service earlier in 2001 but delayed it by three months due to the possibility of lost revenue from the remaining analogue subscribers, thereby giving those customers extra time to switch to Sky's digital service. The last channel to stop broadcasting via analogue satellite is Sky One.

 2002

 1 May – ITV Digital stops broadcasting, meaning that Sky One is no longer available on Digital Terrestrial Television.
 9 December – Sky One Mix launches.

 2003
 June – Sky One starts broadcasting in 16:9 widescreen. However, all TV commercials were broadcast in 4:3 until 21 November 2005, because they were played off the same servers for all Sky channels, many of which were not broadcast in widescreen.

 2004
 Sky One Mix is rebranded as Sky Mix.

2005
 31 October – Sky One Mix is rebranded as Sky Two, and Sky Three launches mainly as a barker channel on Freeview for Sky's main entertainment channel Sky One and its other subscription services which served to "offer digital terrestrial viewers the opportunity to enjoy a wide variety of popular programmes from Sky". It also broadcasts Sky Travel's commercial presentations selling holiday deals for a number of providers.

 2006
 22 May – Sky launches its high definition service when Sky One HD and Sky Sports 1 HD begin broadcasting.

 2007

 1 March – The Sky basics channels, which include Sky One, stop broadcasting on Virgin Media when the two companies cannot agree a new carriage deal.
 3 June  – The final episode of drama series Dream Team is broadcast after more than 400 episodes and nearly a decade on air.

 2008
 31 August – Sky One, Sky Two and Sky Three are renamed Sky1, Sky2 and Sky3 respectively.
 13 November – The Sky Basics channels, including Sky One, return to Virgin Media.

 2009
 No events.

2010s
2010
 10 May–9 August – Sky conducts three-month experimental revision of Sky Two, under which Sky Two predominantly operated a one-hour timeshift of programming on Sky One. 
 August – The closure of the original Sky Real Lives sees some of its factual and reality programming moving to Sky Two.
 23 August – Sky 3 +1 launches on Freeview, replacing Sky Sports News, and a HD version of the channel is launched.

2011
 1 February – Sky1 and Sky2 are renamed Sky 1 and Sky 2.
 2 February – Sky3 is renamed Sky 3.
 Following the closure of Bravo, some of its programming, particularly in the science-fiction, drama and documentary fields moves to Sky Two.
 28 February – Sky 3 closes and Pick TV is launched to replace it.

2012
 17 July – Sky launches Now TV. It is launched to provide access to Sky TV to those who have no existing pay TV subscription and do not want to be tied into a contract. The service offered only films at first, adding sports in March 2013, and entertainment channels in October 2013.
 12 November – Sky One launches a +1 channel although for licensing reasons, The Simpsons is not broadcast on the timeshift channel.

2013
 No events.

2014
 1 January - Sky One was temporarily renamed to Sky Onesie "to encourage viewers to snuggle up in front of the television wearing onesies, in a bid to recover from the previous night's celebrations".

2015
 No events.

2016
 No events.

2017

 Some sport coverage begins to be shown on Sky One. This includes a partial simulcast of Soccer Saturday, highlights of, and occasional live coverage of, Formula One motor racing and the occasional live football match.
 2017 also sees Sky One moving away from factual programming to showing more comedy and drama programs for the future.
 9 October – The branding and presentation on Sky's entertainment channels is revised again; as part of this the names Sky One and Sky Two are reintroduced nine years after the switch to numerals. Sky Two drops its previous filmed idents in favour of using an animated sting featuring the new channel logo.

2018
 No events.

2019
  The summer of 2019 sees Sky One show highlights of the 2019 Cricket World Cup, including the final, and live coverage of England's matches in the 2019 Netball World Cup.

2020s
2020

27 August – Sky Replay replaces Sky Two.

2021
 1 September – Sky One closes after nearly 40 years on air. Its programmes mostly transfer to a new channel, Sky Max.

See also
Timeline of Sky Cinema
Timeline of Sky News
Timeline of Sky Sports

References

Sky One
Sky One
Sky One
Sky One
Sky One
Sky Group
Sky Group timelines